Reach for the Sky is a 1956 film starring Kenneth More as Douglas Bader.

Reach for the Sky may also refer to:

 Reach for the Sky (novel), a 1954 biography by Paul Brickhill about pilot Douglas Bader, the basis for the 1956 film
 Reach for the Sky (2001 film), a film about pilots in the Israeli army
 Reach for the Sky (The Allman Brothers Band album)
 Reach for the Sky (Ratt album)
 Reach for the Sky (Sutherland Brothers and Quiver album)
 Reach for the Sky, an album by Cowboy
 "Reach for the Sky" (FireHouse song)
 “Reach for the Sky”, a song by Gary Moore from his album Run for Cover
 "Reach for the Sky" (Mai Kuraki song)
 "Reach for the Sky" (Social Distortion song)

See also
 Reach the Sky, an American hardcore punk band